Thomas-Philippe Pelletier (22 December 1823 – 28 April 1913) was a Canadian merchant and politician.

Biography
Born in Sainte-Anne-de-la-Pocatière, Lower Canada, the son of Germain Pelletier and Marie Marthe Pelletier, Pelletier was educated at the Collège de Sainte-Anne-de-la-Pocatière and then became a school teacher. He later opened a general merchandise business in Trois-Pistoles and was the postmaster of Trois-Pistoles for fifty-three years. In 1892, he was appointed to the Legislative Council of Quebec for the division of Grandville. A Conservative, he served until his death in 1913.

He married Caroline Casault, the daughter of Louis-Napoléon Casault, in 1854. His was the father of Louis-Philippe Pelletier.

References
 
 

1823 births
1913 deaths
Conservative Party of Quebec MLCs
Canadian postmasters
People from Trois-Pistoles, Quebec